Year 1166 (MCLXVI) was a common year starting on Saturday (link will display the full calendar) of the Julian calendar.

Events 
 By place 

 Byzantine Empire 
 Emperor Manuel I (Komnenos) asks Venice to help pay the costs of defending Sicily, whose Norman rulers have had good relations with Venice. Doge Vitale II Michiel refuses to pay the requested subsidy. Manuel begins to cultivate relationships with the main commercial rivals of Venice: Genoa and Pisa. He grants them their own trade quarters in Constantinople, very near the Venetian settlements.

 Europe 
 May 7 – King William I (the Wicked) of Sicily dies at Palermo after a 12-year reign. He is succeeded by his 12-year-old son William II (the Good), whose mother, Margaret of Navarre, will be regent until he comes of age.
 Battle of Pantina: The Byzantines intervene on behalf of Grand Prince Tihomir of Serbia against his rebellious brother, Prince Stefan Nemanja, who defeats the Byzantine forces and becomes Grand Župan of Serbia.
 Henry the Lion, duke of Saxony, has the Brunswick Lion created at Dankwarderode Castle in Braunschweig (modern Germany). Mentioned by  Albert of Stade, a German abbot and chronicler, as the year of origin.
 July 5 – The town of Bad Kleinkirchheim (modern Austria) is first mentioned, in an ecclesiastical document, in which Archbishop Conrad II of Salzburg confirms the donation of a chapel, nearby Millstatt Abbey.
 Autumn – Emperor Frederick I (Barbarossa) begins his fourth Italian campaign, hoping to secure the claim of Antipope Paschal III in Rome and the coronation of his wife Beatrice I as Holy Roman Empress.
 Mieszko III (the Old) proclaims a Prussian crusade against the pagans and pressures the collaboration of Frederick I. He leaves Greater Poland in the hands of his younger brother Casimir II (the Just).

 England 
 Diarmaid mac Murchadha is exiled and goes to Normandy, and the court of King Henry II to ask for assistance in retaking his kingdom. Henry gives him permission to find a willing army from either England or Wales. 
 Richard de Clare (Strongbow), 2nd Earl of Pembroke, and his half-brothers Robert FitzStephen and Maurice FitzGerald, agree to help Diarmaid mac Murchadha in return for Diarmaid's daughter's hand in marriage.
 Cartae Baronum ("Charters of the Barons"), a survey commissioned by the Treasury requiring each baron to declare how many knights he had enfeoffed.
 Summer – Henry II invades and conquers Brittany to punish the local Breton barons. He grants the territory to his 7-year-old son Geoffrey.
 Henry II enacts the Assize of Clarendon, reforming English law, with the aim of improving the justice process, including the jury system.
 William Marshal, a Norman statesman, described as "the greatest knight that ever lived", is knighted while on campaign in Normandy.

 Ireland 
 Muirchertach mac Lochlainn, High King of Ireland, is killed. He is succeeded by Ruaidrí Ua Conchobair, king of Connacht, who defeats Diarmaid mac Murchadha (or Dermot) in battle, another ruler in eastern Ireland.

Births 
 February 24 – Al-Mansur Abdallah, Zaidi imam (d. 1217)
 July 29 – Henry I (or Henry II), king of Jerusalem (d. 1197)
 December 24 – John, king of England (d. 1216)
 Abu al-Abbas al-Nabati, Moorish pharmacist (d. 1239)
 Alan IV (the Young), viscount of Rohan (d. 1205)
 Arnold of Altena, German nobleman (d. 1209)
 Choe U, Korean general and dictator (d. 1249)
 Humphrey IV, lord of Toron (approximate date)
 Judah ben Isaac Messer, French rabbi (b. 1224)
 Odo III (or Eudes), duke of Burgundy (d. 1218)
 Philip d'Aubigny, English nobleman (d. 1236)
 Prithviraj Chauhan, Indian ruler of Ajmer (d. 1192)
 Shimazu Tadahisa, Japanese warlord (d. 1227)
 Shunten (or Shunten-Ō), Ryukyu ruler (d. 1237)
 Tamar the Great, queen of Georgia (d. 1213)
 Wansong Xingxiu, Chinese Buddhist monk (d. 1246)
 William de Warenne, 5th Earl of Surrey (d. 1240)

Deaths 
 February 21 – Abdul Qadir Gilani, Persian preacher (b. 1078)
 April 9 – Waleran de Beaumont, English nobleman (b. 1104)
 May 7 – William I (the wicked), king of Sicily (b. 1120)
 October 12 - Henry I, duke of Wiślica
 Ahmad Yasawi, Turkic Sufi religious leader (b. 1093)
 Athanasius VII bar Qatra, Syrian patriarch of Antioch
 Fujiwara no Motozane, Japanese waka poet (b. 1143)
 Gillamaire Ua Conallta, Irish poet and Chief Ollam 
 Grigor III, Armenian catholicos of Cilicia (b. 1093)
 Konoe Motozane, Japanese nobleman (b. 1143)
 Muirchertach mac Lochlainn, High King of Ireland
 Rosalia, Norman nobleman and saint (b. 1130)

References